The West African Linguistic Society (abbreviated as WALS) is an academic scholarly society formed in 1965 with the aim of fostering and encouraging research in the West African languages and literatures as well as providing a permanent forum for interaction and exchange of ideas among scholars of African languages. Membership of the Society is largely drawn from teachers and researchers in universities and research institutes and they include scholars from all over the world. The society publishes the Journal of West African Languages. WALS is now a member of the Federation Internationale des Langues et Literatures Modernes (FILLM). Prof. Lendzemo Constantine Yuka is the current President of WALS while Dr. DJibril SIlue is the Secretary-Treasurer. Visit www.westafricanlinguisticsocietywals.org for more

Relevant Literature
Lendzemo Constantine Yuka and Adams Bodomo. 2022. "Towards the development of linguistics in West Africa: The contributions of the West African Linguistic Society."   Beyond Babel: Scholarly organizations and the study of languages and literatures, Tom Clark (Editor), pp. 43-58. John Benjamins.

External links

www.westafricanlinguisticsocietywals.org
 WALS Facebook
Journal of West African Languages website

Linguistic societies
Organizations established in 1965